Brookesia griveaudi, commonly known as the Marojejy leaf chameleon, is a species of chameleon, a lizard in the family Chamaeleonidae. The species is endemic to northeastern Madagascar. It was described as a species new to science by Brygoo, Blanc, and Domergue in 1974. It is listed as Near Threatened by the International Union for Conservation of Nature.

Etymology
The specific name, griveaudi, is in honor of entomologist Paul Griveaud (1907–1980), who worked in Madagascar.

Distribution and habitat
B. griveaudi is endemic to northeastern Madagascar, and has a type locality of the Marojejy National Park and on the Marojejy Massif, in the region of Sava.

Conservation status
The International Union for Conservation of Nature has listed B. griveaudi as Near Threatened because the population of the species is spread out considerably, despite the area it covers. It is affected mainly by logging and the slash-and-burn method of agriculture. The species is found in many protected places/areas, and the population is believed to be declining.

Description
During the day, the Marojejy leaf chameleon stays with its young and eggs.

Taxonomy
The species B. griveaudi was initially described by Brygoo, Blanc, and Domergue in 1974, and has been published on three times since: Glaw and Vences (1994: 236), Nečas (1999: 277), and, most recently, by Townsend et al. in 2009. B. griveaudi is commonly known as the Marojejy leaf chameleon, after the type locality of the species.

References

Further reading
Brygoo E-R, Blanc CP, Domergue CA (1974). "Notes sur les Brookesia de Madagascar. VII. Brookesia du Marjezy, B. betschi et B. griveaudi n. sp. (Reptilia, Squamata, Chamaeleonidae) ". Bull. Acad. Malgache 51 (1): 167-184. (Brookesia griveaudi, new species). (in French).

G
Endemic fauna of Madagascar
Reptiles of Madagascar
Near threatened animals
Vulnerable biota of Africa
Reptiles described in 1974
Taxa named by Édouard-Raoul Brygoo
Taxa named by Charles Pierre Blanc
Taxa named by Charles Domergue